Knema glaucescens is a species of plant in the family Myristicaceae. It is native to Sumatra, Peninsular Malaysia, Singapore and Borneo. However, a morpho-taxonomic study of fossil leaves assemblage discovered from the upper part of the Siwalik succession of sediments of Papum Pare district, Arunachal Pradesh, India, had shape, base and venation pattern comparable to Knema glaucescens (Myristicaceae).

References

glaucescens
Flora of Sumatra
Flora of Malaya
Flora of Borneo
Taxonomy articles created by Polbot